Contempo Magazine is a bi-monthly magazine that features photo-essays in fashion and culture from a South Texas perspective.

History 
The magazine is owned by Contempo Magazine, Inc., and was established in January 2008. It features articles about fashion, home improvement, entertainment, technology, computers, health care, personal finance, travel, pets, food and dining, restaurant reviews, and people stories relevant to the Rio Grande Valley of Texas. Many of the stories deal with the Reynosa–McAllen metropolitan area along the Mexico–U.S border, influenced by both American and Mexican culture. 

William Ralph Magaña is the editor of Contempo Magazine and Tony Magaña is the co-editor and blogger. Magaña also writes for the American Daily Review, and is a member of the National Association of Hispanic Journalists. Other writers have included fashion (Vanessa Valiente and Crystal Felici), computers (Michael Bilyeu), health (Tony Barclay), personal finance (Melissa Magaña), opinions/editorials by Congressmen Henry Cuellar, Rubén Hinojosa and Senator John Cornyn (R-TX).

Contempo Magazine added a weekly internet talk radio program in August 2008 (currently on sabbatical).

OpenCongress, a website project of the Sunlight Foundation and the Participatory Politics Foundation, both of which are non-profit and non-partisan, has listed articles by Contempo Magazine blog as being useful articles for Congressional bills regarding veterans, the Texas border fence, Senator John Cornyn, the economic crisis, and freedom of religion.

The target demographic is affluent Hispanic Baby boomers households of professionals, business owners, and wealthy homeowners ages 30 to 55. Although fashion is a major feature of the magazine, the intended demographic is to catch male readers as well with articles on technology and computers. An active blog discusses local and national issues relevant to McAllen, the Rio Grande Valley, and the nation from a conservative Hispanic point of view.

References

Sources
Member of McAllen Chamber of Commerce https://web.archive.org/web/20110727073200/http://www.mcallen.org/Members/52466
Member of McAllen Hispanic Chamber of Commerce http://www.mhcc.net/directorydetail.cfm?membershipid=553&detail=yes&catid=117
Highest Rated Blog Articles for S.22  May 24, 2008 OpenCongress https://web.archive.org/web/20110520141153/http://www.opencongress.org/bill/110-s22/blogs/2?sort=toprated
Borderlands Conservation and Security Act of 2007 May 4, 2008 OpenCongress https://archive.today/20121129155106/http://74.86.203.130/bill/110-h2593/show
John Cornyn in the Blogs (Highest Rated) July 2008 OpenCongress https://web.archive.org/web/20110520141808/http://www.opencongress.org/people/blogs/300027_john_cornyn/5?sort=toprated
Highest Rated Blog Articles for S.2832  July 31, 2008 OpenCongress http://news.opencongress.org/bill/110-s2832/blogs?sort=toprated
Highest Rated Blog Articles for The Senate Version of the Economic Rescue Plan H.R.1424  October 1, 2008 OpenCongress https://web.archive.org/web/20110520142302/http://www.opencongress.org/bill/110-h1424/blogs/2?sort=toprated
Highest Rated Blog Articles the bill to restore the Free Speech and First Amendment rights of churches and exempt organizations by repealing the 1954 Johnson Amendment. H.R.2275  October 6, 2008 OpenCongress https://web.archive.org/web/20111001083038/http://www.opencongress.org/bill/110-h2275/blogs?sort=toprated
Highest Rated Blog Articles for Employee Free Choice Act of 2007 H.R.800  December 18, 2008 OpenCongress https://archive.today/20130415155954/http://www.opencongress.org/bill/110-h800/blogs?sort=toprated
Highest Rated Blog Articles for American Recovery and Reinvestment Act of 2009 H.R.1 February 4, 2009 OpenCongress https://archive.today/20130415133231/http://www.opencongress.org/bill/111-h1/blogs/6?sort=toprated
Blog Articles for Senator Max Baucus February 10, 2009 OpenCongress https://archive.today/20100101234318/http://news.opencongress.org/people/1/show/300005_max_baucus
Highest Rated Blog Articles for Congressman Joe Baca February 15, 2009 OpenCongress http://74.86.203.130/people/blogs/400009_joe_baca/2?sort=toprated
Highest Rated Blog Articles for Congressman Loretta Sanchez March 2009 OpenCongress http://dev.opencongress.org/people/blogs/400356_loretta_sanchez/6?sort=toprated

External links
 Contempo Magazine official site
 Contempo Magazine Internet Talk Radio official site
 Open Congress Blog official site
 MediaBids.com Media Kit for Contempo Magazine official site

American political blogs
Conservative magazines published in the United States
Magazines established in 2008
Magazines published in Texas
Mexican-American culture in Texas
Monthly magazines published in the United States
Political magazines published in the United States